Chaco River is a river tributary to the San Juan River in San Juan County, New Mexico.

References

Rivers of San Juan County, New Mexico
Rivers of New Mexico